Akhiyan Udeek Diyan ( The eyes are waiting) is an Indian Punjabi language television series that premiered from 22 March 2021 on Zee Punjabi. It starred Simran Kaur, Parmeet Sethi and Keetika Singh in the lead roles. It is an official remake of Zee Marathi's TV series Tula Pahate Re. It ended on 27 August 2021.

Plot 
Vikramjeet and Naina marry despite their age difference and resistance from family and friends, but Naina is unaware of the bond she shares with Vikramjeets dead wife.

Cast 
 Simran Kaur as Naina
 Parmeet Sethi as Vikramjeet
 Keetika Singh as Simrit
 Narendra Saini
 Meenakshi Chugh

Adaptations

References

External links 
 
 Akhiyan Udeek Diyan at ZEE5

2021 Indian television series debuts
2021 Indian television series endings
Punjabi-language television shows
Zee Punjabi original programming